Lennard John Strickland (13 May 1880 – 26 August 1949) was an Australian rules footballer who played with Geelong in the Victorian Football League (VFL).

Notes

External links 

1880 births
1949 deaths
Australian rules footballers from Victoria (Australia)
Geelong Football Club players
People educated at Geelong College